Vairam: Fight for Justice is a 2009 Malayalam film directed by M. A. Nishad under the banner of Cinema NSR India Pvt Ltd. Production controller Sanjay Padiyoor. The main cast includes Pasupathy, Jayasurya, Mukesh, Samvrutha Sunil, and Dhanya Mary Varghese. Samvrutha Sunil was first time paired with Suresh Gopi, who makes a special appearance, in the movie.

Plot
Vairam tells the story of Sivarajan who fights for justice, as he loses his daughter Vairamani who is raped and killed. When the law is blinded by political and monetary power, he has no other option than to hunt down Thalikkulam Josekutty who hails from an influential Achayan family in Thodupuzha.

An investigative journalist of a popular magazine, Annie Jacob digs up the whole story, which becomes a sensation. An offbeat advocate Ravi Varma takes up the case for re-investigation. The SP of the Crime Branch, Thomas Erali IPS, investigates the crime with great zeal, and then the real truth is exposed. The advocate, police officer, and the journalist start the fight for justice together. The movie also tells a small love story between journalist Annie Jacob and advocate Ravi Varma.

Cast

 Pasupathy as Sivarajan
 Suresh Gopi as Advocate Ravi Varma (extended cameo appearance)
 Jayasurya as Thalikkulam Josekutty
 Mukesh as SP Thomas Eerali IPS, Crime Branch
 Samvrutha Sunil as Annie Jacob
 Dhanya Mary Varghese as Vairamani Sivarajan
 Meera Vasudevan as Devi Sivarajan
 Thilakan as Thalikkulam Avarachan
 K. P. A. C. Lalitha
 Harisree Asokan as Sugunan
 Ashokan as Thalikkulam George Kutty
 Sai Kumar
 Tini Tom
 Bhama
 Rekha as Dr.Susan
 Ambika
 Sreelatha Namboothiri
 Sudheer Karamana as Albert
 Ambika Mohan as Albert's & Rosy's mother

Soundtrack
The music was composed by M Jayachandran, with lyrics written by Gireesh Puthenchery.

Production 
The film is loosely based on the Krishnapriya murder case. The plot also resembles with the 1996 film A Time To Kill. After being shot at various locations mainly in Thodupuzha, the film was released on 20 September 2009.

References

External links 
 

2009 films
2000s Malayalam-language films
Indian films based on actual events
Indian rape and revenge films
Films about rape in India
Films scored by M. Jayachandran
Films directed by M. A. Nishad